Juan de Anchieta (Azpeitia, Gipuzkoa, Spain, 1462 – Azpeitia, 1523) was a leading Spanish Basque composer of the Renaissance, at the Royal Court Chaplaincy in Granada of Queen Isabel I of Castile.

History
Born into a leading Basque family, his mother was a great-aunt of Ignatius of Loyola, founder of the Society of Jesus. In 1489 he was appointed to the chapel of Queen Isabella and in 1495 became maestro di capilla to Prince Don Juan, returning to the Queen's service after the Prince's death in 1497, and in 1504 to that of the new Queen, Joanna the Mad. He held various church benefices, from 1518 as Abbot of Arbós, town located at the province of Tarragona, as a chaplain at Granada Cathedral, spending his final years in a Franciscan convent he had founded in Azpeitia.

Sacred Music
Some thirty of Juan de Anchieta's compositions survive, among them two complete Masses, two Magnificats, a Salve Regina, four attributed Passion settings, with other sacred works and four compositions with Spanish texts. The two Masses and many motets which survived, show extensive use of plainsong and much chordal writing. He was among the leading Spanish composers of his generation, writing music for the ample resources of the court chapel of the Catholic Monarchs. Anchieta might be the author of the motet Epitaphion Alexandri Agricolae symphonistae regis Castiliae (published in 1538), which contains important details of the Agricola's biography.

References

External links
 

1462 births
1523 deaths
People from Azpeitia
Spanish classical composers
Spanish male classical composers
Renaissance composers
University of Salamanca alumni